The 2006 First Division season was the 27th of the amateur competition of the first-tier football in Guinea-Bissau. The tournament was organized by the Football Federation of Guinea-Bissau. The season began on 14 January and finished on 14 July.  Balantas won their twelfth title and finished with 50 points and for financial reasons did not qualify and competed in the 2007 CAF Champions League the following season. Portos de Bissau won the 2006 Guinea-Bissau Cup, instead, the cup finalist Benfica Bissau participated in the 2007 CAF Confederation Cup the following season.

It was a 22 match season and had a total of 132 matches.

SC de Bissau was again the defending team of the title. Balantas finished with 50 points and the only club who never lost a match in the season, Mavegro scored the most goals and numbered 37.

Participating clubs

 Sporting Clube de Bissau
 Flamengo Futebol Clube - Promoted from the Second Division
 Sport Portos de Bissau
 Sport Bissau e Benfica
 Atlético Clube de Bissorã
 ADR Mansaba - Promoted from the Second Division

 DRC Farim - Promoted from the Second Division
 Futebol Clube de Cantchungo
 Mavegro Futebol Clube
 Desportivo de Gabú
 Estrela Negra de Bolama
 CF Os Balantas

Overview
The league was contested by 12 teams with Os Balantas winning the championship.

League standings

See also
Campeonato Nacional da Guiné-Bissau

Footnotes

External links
Historic results at rsssf.org

Guinea-Bissau
Football in Guinea-Bissau